Valentina Vasilevna  Tolkunova (12 July 1946 – 22 March 2010) was a Soviet and Russian singer and was bestowed the title of Honored Artist of RSFSR (1979) and People’s Artist of the RSFSR (1987). Her performances exhibited a kindhearted mood and sincerity, and her voice was noted for its clarity.

Biography
At age 18, Valentina Tolkunova entered Moscow State Art and Cultural University. In 1966, she became a member of Yury Saulsky's jazz band VIO-66 as a soloist and jazz singer. In 1971, she graduated from the Gnessin State Musical College and recorded songs for the TV series Den' za Dnem (Day After Day). The year 1972 was Tolkunova's breakthrough year, due to a noted performance of songs, and marked the beginning of a successful career in radio and TV. In 1973, she began a busy collaboration with the Moscow Philharmonic Concert Association (Moskonzert), and in 1989 she founded and became the director of her own theatre.  Over a thirty-year recording career, Valentina Tolkunova released at least thirteen albums.  She also won many awards in Soviet republics and was a 23-time winner of the "Song of the Year" competition on television.

On 16 February 2010, Tolkunova became ill during a concert in Mogilev, Belarus, and went to a local hospital where she was diagnosed with brain tumor before being transferred to the Botkin Clinic in Moscow. On 22 March, she went into a  coma and died two hours later of a brain tumor.

References

External links

Forum Valentina Tolkunova: art and destiny
Channel Valentina Tolkunova: art and destiny
Интервью с В. Толкуновой
Brief biography and links to her disks
 

1946 births
2010 deaths
People from Armavir, Russia
Burials in Troyekurovskoye Cemetery
Deaths from brain cancer in Russia
Soviet women singers
Recipients of the Order of Honour (Russia)
Recipients of the Lenin Komsomol Prize
Gnessin State Musical College alumni
Soviet voice actresses
Russian voice actresses
People's Artists of the RSFSR
Honored Artists of the RSFSR
20th-century Russian women singers
20th-century Russian singers
21st-century Russian women singers
21st-century Russian singers
Russian folk-pop singers